Mike Moloney is a Gaelic footballer from Killarney, County Kerry. He plays with the Dr Crokes club and the Kerry intercounty team.

He won a Munster Minor Championship medal in 2006 and played in the All Ireland final with Kerry lost out to Roscommon. In 2008, he was full back on the Kerry team that won the All Ireland Under 21 title. In 2011 he was part of the London team that picked up their first championship win since the 1970s.

With Dr Crokes he won a County Championship medal in 2010 and a Munster Championship in 2006 and played in the 2007 All Ireland Club final. In London, he played with the Kingdom Kerry Gaels club.

References

External links
 http://hoganstand.com/kerry/ArticleForm.aspx?ID=143577
 https://web.archive.org/web/20190328115822/http://munster.gaa.ie/history/u21f_teams/
 https://web.archive.org/web/20100210054810/http://munster.gaa.ie/history/mf_teams/

Living people
Dr Crokes Gaelic footballers
Kerry inter-county Gaelic footballers
Kingdom Kerry Gaels Gaelic footballers
1988 births
London inter-county Gaelic footballers